Mariadeira is a neighbourhood of the Portuguese city of Póvoa de Varzim. it is located in the Matriz/Mariadeira district.

Mariadeira derives from Maria da Eira (Mary of the threshing floor).
Located inland, Mariadeira is an old place, but its major development was in late 20th century, thus it has different topologies.

Despite being a small neighbourhood, it is one of the most dynamic, thus it is known as the biggest of the smallest. It is known to bring famous Portuguese popular music performers to its Saint Peter festival, attracting many to the neighbourhood during the city’s Saint Peter festivities.

Neighbourhoods of Póvoa de Varzim